The Polish League Cup was a short lived cup competition in Poland spanning three editions from 1999 to 2002.

The Polish League Cup was a newly created competition to revive the League Cup in Poland, which was last cancelled 21 years prior in 1978. The competition was presented and pushed by Zbigniew Boniek and Richard Raczkowski. They wanted the competition to have a high interest from the fans and to make games competitive. They did this by giving a large financial bonus for each round the team got into, with the winner earning a total of 1.3 million PLN. The format of the competition changed between its editions. The first edition was a two-legged knockout tournament with the final being a one-off game to win the competition. The second and third editions followed the same format but included teams from the II liga and saw the finals being played over two legs.

Polish League Cup 1999–2000
The first edition of the Polish League Cup only involved those 16 teams in the Ekstraklasa with the competition being a knockout tournament with teams playing each other twice, both home and away. The final was an all Warsaw affair with the game being contested between Polonia Warsaw and Legia Warsaw, with the final being held at Legia's stadium.

Final 

Polonia Warsaw won the 1999–2000 Polish League Cup.

Polish League Cup 2000–2001
The second edition saw the introduction of teams in the II liga, a move which was generally seen as positive for the competitiveness of the competition with the lower league teams often rising to the challenge of those teams in the league above. The final was contested between Zagłębie Lubin and Wisła Kraków, with this years tournament being played over a two-legged final, seeing the finalists playing both home and away.

Final

First-leg

Second-leg 

Wisła Kraków won the 2000–2001 Polish League Cup winning 4–2 on aggregate.

Polish League Cup 2001–2002
The third, and what turned out to be the final Polish League Cup, was again contested between teams from the I liga and II liga. The two finalists were Legia Warsaw and Wisła Kraków, Legia being the losing finalist in the first edition, and Wisła being the winner of the previous edition.

Final

First-leg

Second-leg 

Legia Warsaw won the 2001–2002 Polish League Cup winning 4–2 on aggregate.

Winners and finalists

Aftermath
As was the case with the League Cup in 1977–1978 the competition resulted in low attendances and low interest from fans. After the third edition the Polish Football Association stated that they would not be organising any further tournaments and the competition was taken off the calendar. A League Cup competition returned again in 2006 with the Ekstraklasa Cup, but that too lasted only three seasons before being taken off the footballing calendar for good.

References

Football cup competitions in Poland
Defunct football competitions in Poland
Recurring sporting events established in 1999
Recurring sporting events disestablished in 2002
1999 establishments in Poland
2002 disestablishments in Poland